Saunemin may refer to:

 Saunemin, Illinois, village
 Saunemin Township, Livingston County, Illinois